This is a list of Turkish television related events from 2015.

Events
18 February - Elnur Hüseynov wins the fourth season of O Ses Türkiye.
14 July - 16-year-old stand-up comedian Yunus Karaca wins the sixth season of Yetenek Sizsiniz Türkiye.
28 November - The Turkish version of Big Brother debuts on Star TV.

Debuts
28 November - Big Brother Türkiye (2015–present)

Television shows

2010s
O Ses Türkiye (2011–present)

Ending this year

Births

Deaths

See also
2015 in Turkey

References